Sir Alfred Sandlings Cowley (24 April 1848 – 1 December 1926) was a politician in Queensland, Australia. He was a Member of the Queensland Legislative Assembly.

Early life

Cowley was born in Fairford, Gloucestershire, England, the son of Isaac Cowley and Charlotte his wife. When still a boy he accompanied his parents to Natal, South Africa. He served an apprenticeship to the building and engineering trade, making the erection of sugar machinery a specialty; but he subsequently became an agriculturist, and was for three years engaged in cultivating sugar and coffee. Early in 1871 Cowley left Natal for the Australian colonies, and was a resident of New South Wales for over two years, part of which time he was in charge of a central sugar-mill on the Macleay River.

Cowley resided in the Maryborough district of Queensland for three years, during which time he was engaged in the cultivation and manufacture of sugar. After that Cowley settled in the Lower Herbert district, and was actively employed in the sugar industry.

Cowley was married at Pietermaritzburg, Natal, on 24 July 1880, to Miss Marie Campbell.

Politics

Cowley was a member of the Hinchinbrook Divisional Board and was its chairman from 1883 to 1886.

Cowley was elected to the Queensland Legislative Assembly in the electoral district of Herbert on 12 May 1888, and on the formation of the Griffith–McIlwraith Government in August 1890 was appointed Secretary for Public Lands and Agriculture, and sworn of the Executive Council. He served as Speaker from 1893 to 1899 and from 1903 to 1907. He was knighted in 1904.  His parliamentary service ended on 18 May 1907 when he was defeated in the 1907 election.

Later life

Cowley died on 1 December 1926 at his residence Silky Oaks in Cross Street, Toowong, Brisbane and was buried on 2 December in the Toowong Cemetery.

Further reading

References

1848 births
1926 deaths
Members of the Queensland Legislative Assembly
Speakers of the Queensland Legislative Assembly
Australian Knights Bachelor
Burials at Toowong Cemetery
People from Fairford
English emigrants to Australia